Live at the Roxy, London – April 1st & 2nd 1977/Live at CBGB Theatre, New York – July 18th 1978 is a live double album by English rock band Wire. It was released in 2006. It comprises 1 and 2 April 1977 performances at The Roxy, London, England and an 18 July 1978 performance at CBGB, New York City, United States.

Track listing 

 Disc one Live at the Roxy, London - April 1st & 2nd 1977

 Disc two Live at CBGB Theatre, New York - July 18th 1978

Personnel 

 Wire

 Bruce Gilbert – guitar
 Robert Gotobed – drums
 Graham Lewis – bass guitar, backing vocals
 Colin Newman – guitar (tracks 2-1 and 2-12), vocals

 Production

 Denis Blackham – mastering
 David Coppenhall – design
 Chris Hollebone – engineering (track 1 and tracks 1–34)
 Charles Martin – mixing (tracks 2-1 to 2-12)
 Phil Newell – engineering (track 1 and tracks 1–34)
 Colin Newman – liner notes, production (post-production)
 Gus Stewart – cover photography
 Mike Thorne – original project production

References

External links 

 

2006 live albums
Wire (band) live albums
Albums produced by Mike Thorne